Mother Jones Prison, also known as Mrs. Carney's Boarding House, was located at Pratt, Kanawha County, West Virginia.  It was a large two-story structure constructed by the Willis Brothers and used mostly as a boarding house.  It was the "prison" in which labor organizer and agitator Mary Harris "Mother" Jones was detained during the 1912–1913 mine wars.

The building was a National Historic Landmark. It was listed on the National Register of Historic Places in 1992. However, it was delisted in 1997 after being demolished in 1996.

References

Demolished buildings and structures in West Virginia
Former National Historic Landmarks of the United States
Former National Register of Historic Places in West Virginia
Houses in Kanawha County, West Virginia
Coal Wars